Sports Complex SC Nyva (Sportyvna baza SK Nyva) is a football only stadium in Vinnytsia, Ukraine. The complex was opened on 9 May 2010 and owned by FC Nyva Vinnytsia.

Description
Aside of the main field it has two mini fields (20 x 40 meters), covered sports hall and pool, an administrative building with offices and conference hall, a three-story building which includes a small hotel for footballers (20 rooms), changing and shower rooms, a room for referee, journalist and VIP lodges, a fitness hall and club's souvenir store. There also is a restaurant, summer café, fan bar, children playground, parking for over 100 cars and others.

Main arena
The turf field is composed out of a fifth generation artificial turf 105 x 68 meters. There are six floodlight towers with a total luminosity of 1,200 lux and an electronic score stand.

The total seat capacity is 3,282 including the "sunny" stand with 1,512, "shady" stand with 918 and some 852 seats in total behind both goalposts.

References

External links
 Stadium at Nyva Vinnytsia website
 In Vinnytsia opened a new sports complex Nyva (Photos). Moya Vinnytsia portal (myvin.com). 28 May 2010.

Football venues in Ukraine
Sports venues in Vinnytsia
FC Nyva Vinnytsia
Sports complexes in Ukraine